Francis Allen (c. 1645 – 22 March 1712) was a Belgian Jesuit. He was admitted into the Society of Jesus on 9 October 1678, and died at Liège on 22 March 1712, at the age of 67.

See also

Sources

1640s births
1712 deaths
Jesuits of the Spanish Netherlands
Jesuits of the Austrian Netherlands